The following lists events that happened during 2002 in East Timor.

Incumbents
President: Xanana Gusmão (starting 20 May)
Prime Minister: Mari Alkatiri (starting 20 May)

Events

May
 May 20 - East Timor restores its Republic as proclaimed back in 1975, thus confirming its independence from Portugal in 2002.

References

 
East Timor
Years of the 21st century in East Timor
2000s in East Timor
East Timor
East Timor